Kuty (Kąty) defence – was a skirmish between Polish self-defense units and Ukrainian Insurgent Army unit under commander Ivan Klymshyn (nom de guerre "Crow") and Andriy Melnyk's supporters in the village of Kuty (Polish Kąty) located in Volhynia, Krzemieniec (Kremenets) county, Shumsk commune 3 or 4 May 1943. During the fight no less than 53 Poles were killed, although the assault was repelled by self-defense forces. After the battle Poles abandoned the village, and escorted by Germans went to Shumsk and later to Kremenets.

Prelude
Kuty was a Polish village with 234 Polish families (919 people) and 12 Ukrainian families.  During the Soviet occupation some Poles were deported to Siberia.  On November 14, 1942 Ukrainians killed a local leader, Władysław Giżycki, an organizer of the local Riflemen's Association.

After assassinations of individual Poles in late 1942, inhabitants of Kuty formed a self-defense unit. Leaders of the self-defense force included: Jan Jasiński, Feliks Jasiński, former accountant and soltys Stefczyk, Władysław Jasiński, Roman Kucharski, Edward Wawrzykowski and former soldiers - corporals Stanisław Jasiński and Stanisław Szymański. The self-defense unit gathered 25 rifles, some revolvers and hand grenades. The rest of men, in the event of an attack armed themselves with pitch-forks and scythes.

The line of defense in the center of the village included a bricked houses and a church with a tower. Since February 1943, when the Massacres of Poles in Volhynia had started, inhabitants who were afraid of attacks, began gathering in the centre of the village at night.

On May 2, the Ukrainian Insurgent Army (UIA) planned to attack the Polish village. This information leaked out to the villagers who began defence preparations, although many inhabitants did not believe that the UIA was a threat.

Assault
On 3 (or 4) May about 10:20 pm UIA members and Melnyk supporters attacked the village from the north. In the village two thousand Poles from Kuty and nearby villages gathered. Houses at the village's perimeter were robbed, people who were not able to escape were butchered, and houses were burned down. Poles formed a defence line using rifles, safe from fire inside bricked houses. The church tower became the main point of the resistance. The battle lasted until 3:30 the next day when the Ukrainian command decided to withdraw all forces. At least 53 Poles perished.

Aftermath
The self-defense forces decided to abandon the village due to a lack of ammunition. In the morning the Germans came from Shumsk, arrived at Kuty concerned by the glow of fire and the sound of gunfire. They gave 3 hours for everyone to pack their belongings and escorted the inhabitants to Shumsk. The next day all refugees departed to Kremenets. Most of inhabitants were deported to Germany to be used as slave labor as OST-Arbeiter. The abandoned village was razed except for the Ukrainian households. Bricked houses were disassembled. Poles who returned to Kuty after a few days were killed. The total number of Polish deaths due to the skirmish was 67 people.

See also

 Historiography of the Volyn tragedy
 Massacres of Poles in Volhynia
 Przebraże Defence

Sources
  
  

1943 in Europe
World War II massacres
Poland in World War II
World War II crimes in Poland
Massacres of Poles in Volhynia
War crimes committed by the Ukrainian Insurgent Army